Radial basis function (RBF) interpolation is an advanced method in approximation theory for constructing high-order accurate interpolants of unstructured data, possibly in high-dimensional spaces. The interpolant takes the form of a weighted sum of radial basis functions, like for example Gaussian distributions. RBF interpolation is a mesh-free method, meaning the nodes (points in the domain) need not lie on a structured grid, and does not require the formation of a mesh. It is often spectrally accurate and stable for large numbers of nodes even in high dimensions.

Many interpolation methods can be used as the theoretical foundation of algorithms for approximating linear operators, and RBF interpolation is no exception. RBF interpolation has been used to approximate differential operators, integral operators, and surface differential operators.

Examples
Let  and let  be 15 equally spaced points on the interval . We will form  where  is a radial basis function, and choose  such that  ( interpolates  at the chosen points). In matrix notation this can be written as
 

Plotting the interpolating function below, we see that it is visually the same everywhere except near the left boundary (an example of Runge's phenomenon), where it is still a very close approximation.

Motivation
 

is singular.

This means that if one wishes to have a general interpolation algorithm, one must choose the basis functions to depend on the interpolation points. In 1971, Rolland Hardy developed a method of interpolating scattered data using interpolants of the form . It has been shown that the resulting interpolation matrix will always be non-singular. This does not violate the Mairhuber–Curtis theorem since the basis functions depend on the points of interpolation. Choosing a radial kernel such that the interpolation matrix is non-singular is exactly the definition of a strictly positive definite function. Such functions, including the Gaussian, inverse quadratic, and inverse multiquadric are often used as radial basis functions for this reason.

Shape-parameter tuning 
Many radial basis functions have a parameter that controls their relative flatness or peakedness. For example, Rolland Hardy used the formula  for the multiquadric, however nowadays the formula  is used instead. These formulas are equivalent up to a scale factor. This factor is inconsequential since the basis vectors have the same span and the interpolation weights will compensate. By convention, the basis function is scaled such that  as seen in the plots of the Gaussian functions and the bump functions.

A consequence of this choice, is that the interpolation matrix approaches the identity matrix as  leading to stability when solving the matrix system. The resulting interpolant will in general be a poor approximation to the function since it will be near zero everywhere, except near the interpolation points where it will sharply peak the so-called "bed-of-nails interpolant" (as seen in the plot to the right).

On the opposite side of the spectrum, the condition number of the interpolation matrix will diverge to infinity as  leading to ill-conditioning of the system.

There are sometimes other factors to consider when choosing a shape-parameter. For example the bump function

has a compact support (it is zero everywhere except when ) leading to a sparse interpolation matrix.

Some radial basis functions such as the polyharmonic splines have no shape-parameter.

See also 
Kriging

References 

Numerical analysis
Approximation theory
Interpolation